, also written 2010 FX86, is a relatively bright trans-Neptunian object with an absolute magnitude of about 4.65.

It was first discovered on 17 March 2010, at Las Campanas Observatory in Chile, by S. S. Sheppard, A. Udalski and I. Soszynski. No earlier precovery images for it have been found.

Notes

References

External links 
 

Kuiper belt objects
Minor planet object articles (unnumbered)

20100317